The jelly blubber (Catostylus mosaicus), also known as the blue blubber jellyfish, is a species of jellyfish from coastal regions in the Indo-Pacific. It is the most commonly encountered jellyfish along the Australian eastern coast and large swarms sometimes appear in estuarine waters.

Description

In Sydney waters, the jelly blubber's large bell is a creamy white or brown colour, but farther north in Australia it is usually blue. The colours are derived from symbiotic algal plant cells within the body of the jellyfish. There is no obvious mouth on the underside, but there are small openings on each arm, through which food is passed to the stomach. The tentacles also have stinging cells that can capture tiny crustaceans and other plankton. It can grow up to 35cm across.

The sting can be painful but generally poses no serious risk to humans.

Distribution and habitat
This jellyfish is found in coastal parts of the Indo-Pacific. In Australia, it occurs off the coasts of Queensland, New South Wales and Victoria. It can also enter intertidal estuaries.

Food
Eats mainly plankton, small fish, some crustaceans, and small particles in the ocean water.

References

Animals described in 1824
Catostylus